Polnočné otázky: 16 Naj 1984–1993 (The Midnight Questions: Top 16 1984–1993), also known as Top 16, is the second compilation album by Marika Gombitová, released on OPUS in 1993. The set featured a new track, "Novembrové chryzantémy".

Track listing

Official releases
 1993: Polnočné otázky: 16 Naj 1984–1993, LP, MC, OPUS, #91 2410
 1993: Top 16: Diskotéka Ženského magazínu, re-release, CD, Ženský magazín

Credits and personnel

 Marika Gombitová - lead vocal, writer
 Václav Patejdl - music
 Gabo Dušík - writer
 Andrej Šeban - writer
 Kamil Peteraj - lyrics, notes
 Peter Breiner - producer
 Ján Lauko - producer

 Peter Smolinský - producer
 Juraj Filo - sound director
 Ivan Jombík - sound director
 Jozef Krajčovič - sound director
 Ivan Minárik - sound director
 Alexander Soldán - mastering
 Tibor Borský - photography

References

General

Specific

External links 
 

1985 compilation albums
Marika Gombitová compilation albums